Peter Glenville (born Peter Patrick Brabazon Browne; 28 October 19133 June 1996) was an English film and stage actor and director.

Biography
Born in Hampstead, London, into a theatrical family, Glenville was the son of Shaun Glenville (born John Browne, 1884–1968), an Irish-born comedian, and Dorothy Ward, both pantomime performers.

He attended Stonyhurst College and then studied law at Christ Church, Oxford. He was president of the Oxford University Dramatic Society, and performed in many roles for them.

Career
Glenville appeared as an actor in the UK, where he also started directing. Between 1934 and 1947, he appeared in various leading roles "ranging from Tony Pirelli in Edgar Wallace's gangster drama On the Spot and Stephen Cass in Mary Hayley Bell's horror thriller Duet for Two Hands to Romeo, Prince Hal and an intense Hamlet in a production which he also directed for the Old Vic company in Liverpool..."

Glenville's directorial debut on Broadway was Terence Rattigan's The Browning Version in 1949, which starred Maurice Evans.

Other notable productions which followed included The Innocents (1950), the stage adaptation of Henry James' The Turn of the Screw, Shakespeare's Romeo and Juliet, which starred Douglass Watson, Jack Hawkins and marked the Broadway debut of Olivia de Havilland (1951), Rattigan's Separate Tables (1954) and Georges Feydeau's Hotel Paradiso (1957).

Glenville directed the Bridget Boland play The Prisoner at the Lyceum Theatre, Edinburgh in March 1954 and then at the Globe Theatre in London, starring Alec Guinness. Glenville directed the 1955 film version of The Prisoner, his film directorial debut. The film also starred his friend Alec Guinness.

In the 1960s, Glenville and his companion "Bill" Smith moved from London to New York and continued to work in the theatre and in films. From that period, he directed the musical Take Me Along (1959–60), based on Eugene O'Neill's play Ah, Wilderness!, with Jackie Gleason, Walter Pidgeon, Robert Morse, Una Merkel and Eileen Herlie. In 1960, Glenville also directed Barbara Bel Geddes and Henry Fonda on Broadway in Silent Night, Lonely Night by Robert Anderson.

In 1961, he directed Jean Anouilh's play Becket which starred Laurence Olivier as Thomas Becket and Anthony Quinn as Henry II. An erroneous story arose in later years that during the run, Quinn and Olivier switched roles and Quinn played Becket to Olivier's King. Critic Howard Taubman, in his book The Making of the American Theatre, supports this story, as does a biographer of Laurence Olivier. In fact, Quinn left the production for a film, never having played Becket, and director Glenville suggested a road tour with Olivier as Henry. Olivier happily acceded and Arthur Kennedy took on the role of Becket for the tour and brief return to Broadway.

On Broadway, in 1962–63, he directed Quinn and Margaret Leighton in Tchin-Tchin. This was followed by the musical Tovarich (1963) with Vivien Leigh and Jean-Pierre Aumont. For Dylan, based on the life of Dylan Thomas (1964), Glenville worked once again with his frequent collaborator, Sir Alec Guinness. He also directed Edward Albee's adaptation of Giles Cooper's play Everything in the Garden (1967), John Osborne's A Patriot for Me (1969) with Maximilian Schell, Salome Jens and Tommy Lee Jones in his Broadway debut, and Tennessee Williams' Out Cry (1973).

He directed the films Me and the Colonel (1958) with Danny Kaye, Summer and Smoke (1961) with Geraldine Page and Laurence Harvey, Term of Trial (1962) with Laurence Olivier, Simone Signoret and Sarah Miles, Becket (1964) with Richard Burton and Peter O'Toole, Hotel Paradiso (1966) with Guinness and Gina Lollobrigida and The Comedians (1967) with Elizabeth Taylor, Burton, Guinness and Peter Ustinov.

In 1970, Glenville directed another new Terence Rattigan play in the West End, A Bequest to the Nation In 1971 he began work on the film project of Man of La Mancha, but when he failed to agree with United Artists on the production, he bowed out. In 1973 he directed the original production of Tennessee Williams's Out Cry on Broadway<ref>Gussow, Mel. "Catharsis for Tennessee Williams?" The New York Times, March 11, 1973, retrieved January 13, 2017</ref> after which he retired and eventually moved to San Miguel de Allende, Mexico.

Glenville was nominated for four Tony Awards, two Golden Globe Awards (Becket and Me and the Colonel), one Academy Award (Becket) and one Golden Lion at the Venice Film Festival for Term of Trial.

Personal
He died in New York City on 3 June 1996, aged 82, from a heart attack.Granger, Derek. "Obituary: Peter Glenville" Independent, 10 June 1996, retrieved 13 January 2017

Glenville met Hardy William Smith (1916-2001) after the end of World War II. Smith, a United States Navy veteran, wanted a career in the theater in the UK. According to his biography at the University of Texas (where his papers are kept), "Glenville and Smith became professional and life partners, with Smith producing and Glenville directing plays for the London stage."

Selected filmography
 His Brother's Keeper (1940)
 Return to Yesterday (1940)
 Two for Danger (1940)
 Uncensored (1942)
 Madonna of the Seven Moons (1945)
 Summer and Smoke (1961)
 Becket (1964)
 Hotel Paradiso (1966) (uncredited)
 The Comedians'' (1967) (producer)

References

External links
 Peter Glenville (official website)
 Peter Glenville Papers at the Harry Ransom Center at the University of Texas at Austin

1913 births
1996 deaths
Alumni of Christ Church, Oxford
English film directors
English people of Irish descent
English theatre directors
People educated at Stonyhurst College
People from Hampstead
LGBT film directors
LGBT theatre directors
20th-century English LGBT people